Pressure Sounds is a British DIY record label, specializing in releasing reggae music. Run by Pete Holdsworth, it is one of the most enduring reggae labels in the UK, specializing in reissuing obsolete tunes.  It was originally a subsidiary of On-U Sound.

A couple of labels are closely associated with PS:
 Maximum Pressure which specialises in 1980s dancehall;
 Green Tea, which releases a broad variety of reggae music.

Discography 
PSCD111PS01 - Santic & Friends - An Even Harder Shade of Black - 1995
PS02 - Prince Far I & The Arabs - Dub To Africa - 1995
PS03 - Israel Vibration - The Same Song - 1995
PS04 - Keith Hudson - Brand - 1995
PS05 - Various artists - Sounds & Pressure Volume 1 - 1995
PS06 - Little Roy - Tafari Earth Uprising - 1996
PS07 - Prince Far I - Cry Tuff Dub Encounter (Chapter Three) - 1996
PS08 - Enos McLeod - The Genius of Enos - 1996
PS09 - Lee Perry - Voodooism - 1996
PS10 - Various artists - Sounds & Pressure Volume 2 - 1996
PS11 - Earth & Stone - Kool Roots - 1997
PS12 - Carlton Patterson & King Tubby - Psalms of Drums - 1997
PS13 - Prince Far I & The Arabs - Cry Tuff Dub Encounter (Chapter One) - 1997
PS14 - Channel One - Well  Charged - 1997
PS15 - The Techniques - Techniques in Dub - 1997
PS16 - Various artists - Sounds & Pressure Volume 3 - 1997
PS17 - Various artists - Randy's - 17 North Parade - 1997
PS18 - Prince Far I - Health & Strength - 1997
PS19 - Lee Perry - Produced & Directed by the Upsetter - 1998
PS20 - Derrick Harriott - Riding the Roots Chariot - 1998
PS21 - The Uniques - Watch This Sound - 1998
PS22 - Hitbound Selection - When the Dances Were Changing - 1998
PS23 - Various artists - Sounds & Pressure Volume 4 - 1999
PS24 - The Techniques - Roots Techniques - 1999
PS25 - Prince Jammy - The Crowning of Prince Jammy - 1999
PS26 - Little Roy & Friends - Packin House - 1999
PS27 - Phil Pratt - Phil Pratt Thing - 1999
PS28 - Various artists - Don't Call Us Immigrants - 2000
PS29 - Augustus Pablo - El Rockers - 2000
PS30 - Prince Jazzbo - Mr. Funny - 2000
PS31 - Channel One - Maxfield Avenue Breakdon - 2000
PS32 - Lee Perry - Divine Madness...Definitely - 2001
PS33 - Burning Spear - Spear Burning - 2001
PS34 - Tubby's - Firehouse Revolution - 2001
PS35 - Prince Far I - Psalms For I - 2002
PS36 - The Royals - Pick Up the Pieces - 2002
PS37 - Joe Gibbs & The Professionals - No Bones for the Dogs - 2002
PS38 - Augustus Pablo - In Fine Style - 2003
PS39 - Dennis Bovell - Decibel - More Cuts & Dubs 1976-1983 - 2003
PS40 - Various artists - Red Bumb Ball - Rare & Unreleased Rocksteady 1966-1968 - 2003
PS41 - Various artists - Sounds & Pressure Volume 5 - 2003
PS42 - The Wailing Souls - The Wailing Souls at ChannelOne (Sevens, Twelves and Versions) - 2004
PS43 - Sly & Robbie - Unmetered Taxi: Sly & Robbie's Taxi Productions - 2004
PS44 - The Royals - Dubbing with the Royals - 2004
PS45 - Various artists - Aquarius Rock - The Hip Reggae World of Herman Chin-Loy - 2004
PS46 - Various artists - Down Santic Way - Santic Jamaican Productions - 2005
PS47 - Various artists - Safe Travel - 2005
PS48 - Peter Tosh - Talking Revolution - 2005
PS49 - The Travellers - Black Black Minds - 2005
PS50 - Various artists - More Pressure Volume One - Straight to the Head - 2006
PS51 - Various artists - Take Me To Jamaica - 2006
PS52 - Various artists - Life Goes in Circles (Sounds from the Talent Corporation 1974-1979) - 2006
PS53 - Keith Hudson & The Soul Syndicate - Nuh Skin Up - 2007
PS54 - Keith Hudson - Brand - 2007
PS55 - The Revolutionaries - Drum Sound - More Gems from the Channel One Dub Room 1974-1980 - 2007
PS56 - Rockstone - Native’s Adventures With Lee Perry At The Black Ark September 1977 - 2007
PS57 - Bim Sherman - Tribulation - 2007
PS58 - Joe Higgs - Life Of Contradiction - 2008
PS59 - Various artists - Micron Compilation: Every Mouth Must Be Fed - 2008
PS60 - DJ Kentaro - Tuff Cuts - 2008
PS61 - Jimmy Radway & The Fe Me Time All Stars - Dub I - 2008
PS62 - Various Artists - Once Upon A Time At King Tubby's - 2009
PS63 - Tommy McCook & The Supersonics - Pleasure Dub - 2009
PS64 - Delroy Wilson - Dub Plate Style - 2009
PS65 - King Tubby & The Clancy Eccles All Stars - Sound System International - 2009
PS66 - Various artists - Harder Shade of Black - 2010
PS67 - Prince Jammy - Strictly Dub - 2010
PS68 - Lee Perry & The Upsetters - Sound System Scratch - 2010
PS69 - The Uniques - Absolutely Rock Steady - 2010
PS70 - Lee Perry & The Upsetters - The Return of Sound System Scratch - 2011
PS71 - Augustus Pablo - Message Music - 2011
PS72 - Phil Pratt - Dial M For Murder - 2011
PS73 - Lee Perry & The Upsetters - High Plains Drifter - 2012
PS74 - Various artists - Listen To The Music – Caltone's Jamaican 45's 1966-69 - 2012
PS75 - Dennis Bovell - Mek It Run - 2012
PS76 - Lee Perry/ Various Artists - The Sound Doctor - 2012
PS77 - Yabby You - Deeper Roots - 2012
PS78 - Third World All Stars - Rebel Rock - 2013
PS79 - Bobby Kalphat & The Sun Shot All Stars - Zion Hill - 2013
PS80 - Joe Higgs - Unity is Power - 2013
PS81 - Tommy McCook - Reggae In Jazz - 2013
PS82 - Lee Perry & The Upsetters - Roaring Lion - 2013
PS83 - Horace Andy - Get Wise - 2014
PS84 - Yabby You & The Prophets - Deeper Roots Part 2 - 2014
PS85 - Bunny Lee/Various Artists - Full Up - 2014
PS86 - The Inturns - Consider Yourself - 2014
PS87 - Jimmy Riley - Live It To Know It - 2015
PS88 – Bunny Lee & Friends – Next Cut!
PS89 – Lee Perry – Mr Perry I Presume
PS90 – Skin Flesh & Bones – Dub In Blood
PS91 – Bunny Lee & Friends – Tape Rolling
PS92 – Yabby You & Prophets - Beware Dub 
PS93 – Lloyd Parks – Time A Go Dread
PS94 – King Tubby & Aggrovators – Dubbing In The Back Yard
PS95 – Delroy Wilson – Go Away Dream
PS96 – Lloyd Parks & We The People – Meet The People
PS97 – Aggrovators – Super Dub Disco Style
PS98 – Tommy McCook & Aggrovators – Super Star Disco Rockers
PS99 – Phil Pratt & Revolutionaries – The War Is On Dub Style
PS100 – I Mo Jah – Rockers From The Land Of Reggae
PS101 – Philip Fullwood – Words In Dub
PS102 – Bunny Lee, Prince Jammy, Aggrovators – Dubbing In The Front Yard, Conflict Dub
PS103 – Yabby You & King Tubby – Walls Of Jerusalem
PS104 - Various Artists - Rubadub Revolution
PS105 - Yabby You - King Tubby's Prophecies of Dub
PS106 - Various Artists - When Jah Shall Come
PS107 - Yabby You - Conquering Lion
PS108 - Lee Perry & Friends - Black Art From The Black Ark
PS109 - The Prophets - The Yabby You Sound (Dubs And Versions)
PSDD101 - Various Artists - More Ideas 1988 - 2012
PS110 - The Prophets - The Yabby You Sound (Dubs & Versions)
PS111 - Patrick Andy/Yabby You - Living in Mount Zion

See also 
 List of record labels

References

External links
Official site
Discography at an unofficial On-U Sound site
Discography at Discogs

British record labels
Record labels established in 1995
Reggae record labels